Sweet Whispers, Brother Rush is a 1982 children's novel by Virginia Hamilton. The novel deals with the paranormal, poverty, single motherhood, childhood illness, and child abuse. The novel, like many of Hamilton's works, is set in Ohio.

Background 
Hamilton wrote the novel in two locations — in Ohio during winter and spring, and on an island in the Caribbean.

Hamilton included the metabolic disorder porphyria in the novel because a close friend suffered from it; the author noted that she had wanted to work the disorder into a novel for two decades before using it in Sweet Whispers.

Hamilton's opening paragraph format was inspired in part by Truman Capote's short story "Children on their Birthdays."

Plot 
Theresa "Tree" Pratt is a wise-beyond-her-years teenager in Ohio, caring for her developmentally disabled older brother, Dab, while their mother is often away working. Dab regularly suffers from a strange illness that leaves him incapacitated. One day, Tree sees a well-dressed man while she is leaving school and is immediately attracted to him. The next time she seems him, he is standing in the middle of a table in a closet in the family's apartment, holding an oval mirror. Tree realizes this is a ghost, Brother Rush. Through Brother Rush's mirror, Tree can see scenes from her family's past — including her mother's abuse of her brother. Once Tree's mother, M'Vy, arrives home, Tree confronts her about both Brother Rush's presence and the family's past, as Dab's illness worsens.

Characters 

 Theresa "Tree" Pratt is the protagonist of the novel, Tree cares for her brother Dab while their mother, M'Vy is out, ostensibly working as a domestic worker
 Dabney "Dab" Pratt is Tree's brother, who is developmentally disabled and suffering from a mysterious illness that renders him constantly fatigued and disoriented
 M'Vy is Tree and Dab's mother who works as a practical nurse and is often away from the family's apartment
 Brother Rush is Tree's uncle who regularly appears through a table in the family's apartment, and shows Tree visions of her family's past
 Miss Pricherd is the family's friend and housekeeper
Silversmith, M'Vy's lover

Themes 
Sweet Whispers contains magical realism elements — the ghost character of Brother Rush appears in an otherwise realistic setting. M'Vy tells Tree that she can see ghosts because of the family's African heritage.

Hamilton explores questions of identity, the supernatural, the need to belong within a family, and encounters with death through a Black American point of view.

The character of M'Vy showcases a complicated motherhood, as she is often away from the apartment (and engaged in abuse of Dab when he was younger.) "Hamilton has not created a traditional, stereotypic, idealized mother," wrote one critic.

Hamilton included the ghost of Brother Rush as a literary device to represent the idea that people carry their pasts with them.

Reception
Kirkus Reviews, in reviewing Sweet Whispers, Brother Rush, called it "One of Hamilton's deeply felt family stories" and wrote "like other Hamilton novels this has its rough edges, but they are outweighed here by the blazing scenes, the intensity of Tree's feelings, the glimpses of Dab through her eyes, and the rounded characterization of Vy."

Author Katherine Paterson, reviewing the novel in The New York Times, noted "the last time a first paragraph chilled my spine like this one, I was 16 years old, hunched over a copy of Rebecca."

In the Interracial Books for Children Bulletin, Geraldine Wilson wrote that the novel "is like a thoughtfully designed African American quilt. It is finely stitched, tightly constructed and rooted in cultural authenticity."

Sweet Whispers, Brother Rush has also been reviewed by the English Journal, and the School Library Journal.

Awards 
Sweet Whispers, Brother Rush won the 1983 Coretta Scott King Author Award and the 1983 Boston Globe–Horn Book Award. 
 

The novel was a finalist for the 1983 National Book Award for Young People's Literature and was also a Newberry honor winner.

Further reading 

 Farrell, K. (1990) "Virginia Hamilton's 'Sweet Whispers, Brother Rush' and the Case for a Radical Existential Criticism." Contemporary Literature. 31(2): 161. doi: 10.2307/1208584
 Sobat, G. (1995) "If the Ghost Be There, Then Am I Crazy?: An Examination of Ghosts in Virginia Hamilton's Sweet Whispers, Brother Rush and Toni Morrison's Beloved." Children's Literature Association Quarterly. 20(4): 168. doi:10.1353/chq.0.0927
Wood, N. (2001) "Walk-in Closets and Blood-Red Buicks: Urban Space and Personal Development in Sweet Whispers, Brother Rush." Children's Literature Association Quarterly. 26(4): 163. doi:10.1353/chq.0.1429

References

External links 

 Virginia Hamilton papers at the Library of Congress, which features material on Sweet Whispers, Brother Rush

1982 children's books
1982 novels
American children's novels
Coretta Scott King Award-winning works
Ghost novels
Literature by African-American women
Philomel Books books
Novels set in Ohio
African-American novels